Baupte is a commune in the northwestern French department of Manche, a part of Normandy.

Population

See also
Communes of the Manche department

References

Communes of Manche